Soul in the Night is an album by saxophonists Sonny Stitt and Bunky Green recorded in Chicago in 1966 and released on the Cadet label.

Reception

AllMusic reviewer Scott Yanow stated "Soul in the Night offered up Chicago's famous muscular jazz sound by two of its masters... Stitt and Green wrap their saxes around a tune, exploring gritty and fluid possibilities. The album's stereo version gives each player his own spotlight, as Stitt has one speaker and Green has the other to himself".

Track listing 
All compositions by Sonny Stitt, except where indicated.
 "Soul in the Night" - 4:04   
 "It's Awfully Nice to Be With You" (Neil Hefti) - 3:44   
 "Hot Line" (Les Reed, Reg Tilsley) - 3:47   
 "Home Stretch" - 4:46   
 "The Spies" (Norman Harris) - 6:12   
 "One Alone" (Sigmund Romberg) - 5:46   
 "Sneakin' Up on You" (Ted Daryll, Chip Taylor) - 5:35

Personnel 
Sonny Stitt, Bunky Green - alto saxophone
Odell Brown - organ
Bryce Roberson - guitar
Maurice White - drums

References 

1966 albums
Cadet Records albums
Sonny Stitt albums
Bunky Green albums
Albums produced by Esmond Edwards